The Tasman starling (Aplonis fusca) was described in 1836 by John Gould as a species which occurred on both Norfolk Island and Lord Howe Island. In 1928 Australian ornithologist Gregory Mathews recognized that the plumage of the race from Lord Howe Island was much browner and more greyish than the plumage of the Norfolk Island race and split the species into two forms, the Norfolk starling (Aplonis fusca fusca), and the Lord Howe starling (Aplonis fusca hulliana). Both subspecies are now extinct, thus so the species.


Norfolk starling

The Norfolk starling (Aplonis fusca fusca), was a small bird in the starling family.  It is the extinct nominate subspecies of the Tasman starling.

Distribution
The Norfolk starling was confined to Norfolk Island, an Australian territory in the Tasman Sea between Australia and New Zealand.

Description
 
The Norfolk starling was 20 cm long. The wing length was 9.8 cm to 10.3 cm, the length of the tail was 6.3 to 6.8 cm, the length of the culmen 1.3 cm and tarsus was 2.5 cm. It was generally greyish brown. The males were glossy metallic green from head to the throat. The back, the rump, the uppertail coverts, the wing coverts, and underparts were grey, but undertail coverts were whitish. The bill was black and the eyes orange red. The females were coloured similarly but the greenish gloss were slightly duller and a grey throat contrasted with pale brownish flanks. The under breast was washed ochraceous. The abdomen and the undertail coverts were yellowish white.

Extinction
The reasons for its extinction are unclear. Competition from introduced European starlings, song thrushes and common blackbirds, overhunting and habitat loss through agricultural clearing might have played important roles. Reports in older literature that it was driven to extinction by rats like its relative from Lord Howe Island are incorrect because rats did not become a pest on Norfolk Island until 1940, while the Norfolk starling became extinct in 1923.

Lord Howe starling

The Lord Howe starling (Aplonis fusca hulliana) was a small bird in the starling family. It is an extinct subspecies of the Tasman starling. It was endemic to Lord Howe Island in the Tasman Sea, part of New South Wales, Australia.

Description
 
The Lord Howe starling was 18 cm long. The head, the neck, the mantle and the throat were glossy metallic green. The back was slaty grey with a dull greenish gloss. The rump and the underparts were grey. The tail was grey with brownish tips to the feathers. The wings were rich brown. The iris was orange red.

Ecology
The starlings were called "red-eyes" from their eye colour, or "cudgimeruk" from their distinctive calls, by the islanders. They were forest dwellers which lived and foraged in pairs. During the nesting period a clutch of four to five bluish red-blotched eggs were laid in a nest in a hollow in a dead tree or tree fern.

Extinction
The fate of the Lord Howe starling was sealed in June 1918 when the SS Makambo grounded at Ned's Beach, thus allowing black rats to leave the vessel and overrun the island. Within two years 40% of Lord Howe's endemic bird species were extinct, including the Lord Howe fantail, Lord Howe gerygone, and robust white-eye. The Lord Howe starling vanished by 1919.

References

Bibliography
Errol Fuller (2000). "Extinct Birds", 
 Day, David - The Doomsday Book of Animals
 Greenway, James C. - Extinct and Vanishing Birds of the World 
 Luther, Dieter - Die ausgestorbenen Vögel der Welt: Die neue Brehm-Bücherei 424

External links
BirdLife Species Factsheet: Norfolk Starling
Norfolk Island Starling. Aplonis fusca. by Paul Martinson. Artwork produced for the book Extinct Birds of New Zealand, by Alan Tennyson, Te Papa Press, Wellington, 2006
Illustration on a stamp Birdtheme.org 
Birdlife factsheet - Aplonis fusca
Museum Naturalis - Tasman (Lord Howe Island) Starling
3D view of specimens RMNH 110.032, RMNH 110.033 and RMNH 110.035 at Naturalis, Leiden (requires QuickTime browser plugin)
Norfolk Island Starling. Aplonis fusca. by Paul Martinson. Artwork produced for the book Extinct Birds of New Zealand, by Alan Tennyson, Te Papa Press, Wellington, 2006

Birds described in 1836
Aplonis
Bird extinctions since 1500
Extinct birds of Lord Howe Island
Extinct birds of Norfolk Island